"Blame It on the Disco" is a song by Swedish pop group Alcazar. The song was an entry in the Melodifestivalen 2014 for the Eurovision Song Contest 2014, where it reached the finale, subsequently placing in third place. The single was success in Sweden, peaking at number 10 on the Swedish Singles Chart, but failed to chart internationally, peaking only at number 94 in the Europe official Top-100.

Formats and track listings
These are the formats and track listings of promotional single releases of "Blame It on the Disco".

CD single
"Blame It on the Disco" Radio Edit - 3:04  (Fredrik Kempe, David Kreuger, Hamid "K-One" Pirouzpanah) 
"Blame It on the Disco" Live Acapella Version - 3:00  (Fredrik Kempe, David Kreuger, Hamid "K-One" Pirouzpanah)

Charts

See also
Melodifestivalen 2014

References

External links
Alcazar Official Website
iTunes Preview

Songs about disco
Alcazar (band) songs
Melodifestivalen songs of 2014
2014 singles
Warner Music Group singles
Songs written by Fredrik Kempe
Songs written by David Kreuger
2014 songs
English-language Swedish songs